Balé Mulato – Ao Vivo is Daniela Mercury's fourth live album, released in Brazil in December 2006 through EMI. The tracks of this album (with the exception of the last two) were recorded on September 17, 2006 in Farol da Barra, Salvador, Bahia. It won a Latin Grammy Award in 2007 and sold around 60 000 copies in Brazil, earning a gold certification.

Track listing

Charts

Awards
On November 8, 2007, Balé Mulato - Ao Vivo won a Latin Grammy Award for Best Brazilian Roots/Regional Album.

Certification

References

External links
About the album in Mercury's official website

Daniela Mercury albums
2006 live albums
Latin Grammy Award for Best Portuguese Language Roots Album